The 1991 Akwa Ibom State gubernatorial election occurred on December 14, 1991. NRC candidate Akpan Isemin won the election.

Conduct
The gubernatorial election was conducted using an open ballot system. Primaries for the two parties to select their flag bearers were conducted on October 19, 1991.

The election occurred on December 14, 1991. NRC candidate Akpan Isemin won the election.

References 

1991
December 1991 events in Nigeria
Akwa Ibom State gubernatorial election